Purchase Line School District is a small, public school district located in central Pennsylvania which covers small areas in two counties. It serves a rural region, including the townships of Montgomery and Green, and the Borough of Glen Campbell in Indiana County. It also serves the Boroughs of New Washington, Burnside, Mahaffey, Newburg, and Bell Township in Clearfield County. According to 2000 federal census data, Purchase Line Area School District serves a resident population of 7,687. In 2009, the District residents’ per capita income was $12,174, while the median family income was $31,893. In the Commonwealth, the median family income was $49,501 and the United States median family income was $49,445, in 2010.

History
Purchase Line was established in 1954, and soon after, the Purchase Line Junior/Senior High School and the present South Elementary was built. In 1976, the North and South Elementary Schools were constructed. The Jr.-Sr. High School was renovated at the beginning of the 21st-century. In 2011, the school board announced an intention to close North Elementary School.

Schools

Extracurriculars
Purchase Line School District offers a variety of clubs, activities and an extensive sports program.

Sports
The District funds:

Boys
Baseball - AA
Basketball- AA
Cross country - A
Football - A
Track and field - AA

Girls
Basketball - A
Cross country - A
Softball - A
Track and field - AA
Volleyball - A

Junior high school sports

Boys
Basketball
Football

Girls
Basketball
Volleyball 

According to PIAA directory July 2012

References

External links
 Purchase Line School District
 Penna. Inter-Scholastic Athletic Assn.

School districts in Clearfield County, Pennsylvania
School districts in Indiana County, Pennsylvania
School districts established in 1954
1954 establishments in Pennsylvania